The Maxwell 08 Tour was a tour by American R&B singer Maxwell, his first major tour in over six years. The tour started on October 3, performing a one date show in Europe and Africa, afterwards returning to North America for a two-month trek that kicked off on October 8, in Boston throughout several cities in North America and ending on November 23 in New York City.<ref>Jazmine Sullivan to tour with Maxwell .skopmag.com</ref> The singer performed new tracks from BLACKsummers'night'' scheduled for release summer of 2009, and songs from his previous albums.

Opening Acts

 Jazmine Sullivan (USA—Leg)

Set list
"Get to Know Ya" 
"No One"
"Lifetime"
"This Woman's Work"
"Everwanting: To Want You to Want"
"Sumthin' Sumthin'"
"W/As my Girl
"Pretty Wings" (New)
"Simply Beautiful"
"Fortunate"
"...Til the Cops Come Knockin'"
"Bad Habits" (New)
"Help Somebody"1 (New)
"Cold" (New)
"Ascension (Don't Ever Wonder)"
"Whenever Wherever Whatever"

1 performed only on select dates in the U.S.

Band
Keyboards: Morris Pleasure
Guitar: David Hod, Wah Wah Watson
Bass: Sean Michael Ray 
Drums: Ricardo "Rick" Jordan 
Organs: Shedrick Mitchell 
Saxophone: Kenneth Wahlum lll 
Background vocals: Latina Webb

Tour dates

References

External links
 www.musze.com

Maxwell (musician) concert tours
2008 concert tours